The Midland Alpine borane reduction, or simply the Midland reduction, allows for the asymmetric reduction of carbonyls (primarily ketones) to alcohols. It was developed in the late 1970s by Professor M. Mark Midland at the University of California, Riverside. The Midland Reduction is particularly useful because alpha-pinene is regenerated (although it is fairly cheap, so this matters less than with other chiral molecules), and because both enantiomers are commercially available.  The Alpine borane can be synthesized by refluxing alpha-pinene and 9-BBN in THF.  While both enantiomers of alpine borane are commercially available, it is far cheaper to make than buy.

Many examples of the Midland reduction require a low steric group such as an alkyne or a nitrile so as to increase selectivity.

The stereochemical control comes from coordination of the bulky borane to the carbonyl, followed by hydride transfer opposite the largest group.

See also

 Corey-Itsuno reduction
 Noyori asymmetric hydrogenation

References

Name reactions
Organic reduction reactions